Choi Min-seo (born 5 March 2002) is a South Korean footballer currently playing as a forward.

Career statistics

Club

Notes

References

2002 births
Living people
South Korean footballers
South Korea youth international footballers
Association football forwards
K League 1 players
K League 2 players
Pohang Steelers players
FC Anyang players